Harttiella lucifer is a species of catfish in the family Loricariidae. It is native to South America, where it occurs in the vicinity of Lucifer Massif and Galbao Massif in central French Guiana. The species reaches 4.3 cm (1.7 inches) in standard length. It is known to occur alongside the species Anablepsoides igneus and members of the genus Ituglanis. The species was described in 2012 as part of a taxonomic review of members of the loricariid tribe Harttiini native to the Guianas.

References 

Fish described in 2012
Loricariidae
Catfish of South America
Fish of French Guiana